Indigo Partners, LLC is an American private equity firm which has a controlling interest in the American Frontier Airlines and Chilean low-cost JetSmart, as well as holding stakes in Mexican budget airline Volaris and European low-cost carrier Wizz Air.  It has a partnership with Enerjet launched a new Canadian ultra-low-cost carrier called Lynx Air,.  It was attempting to merge its majority-owned Frontier subsidary with  US-based carrier Spirit Airlines.     

Indigo Partners was founded by Bill Franke and has set up a number of ultra-low-cost airlines around the world.  It is headquartered in Phoenix, Arizona.

History 

At the November 2017 Dubai Air Show, Indigo Partners signed a memorandum of understanding for 430 Airbus: 273 A320neos and 157 A321neos for $49.5 billion at list prices: 146 aircraft will go to Wizz Air, 134 to Frontier Airlines, 80 to Volaris and 70 to JetSmart. Wizz will get 72 A320neo and 74 A321neo, Frontier 100 A320neo and 34 A321neo, Volaris 46 A320neo and 34 A321neo and JetSmart 56 A320neo and 14 A321neo.

Deliveries will begin in 2021, mostly in 2025-26 from Toulouse, France and Mobile, Alabama.
Wizz Air previously ordered 110 A321neos at the 2015 Paris Airshow and its fleet will grow to 300 aircraft by 2025.
Frontier received its first Airbus from Mobile in 2018 and its fleet will triple to 200, flying 50 million passengers in 2026.

On November 29, 2018, Indigo Partners reached a preliminary agreement to buy Icelandic low-cost carrier Wow air after Icelandair Group dropped its takeover. However, on March 22, 2019, it was announced that Indigo Partners withdrew its offer to buy Wow Air.

On November 14, 2021, Indigo Partners ordered 255 A321s.

Fleet

Further reading

References 

Private equity firms of the United States
Companies based in Phoenix, Arizona
Financial services companies established in 2002